King's College London Boat Club is the rowing club of King's College London based on the Tideway of the River Thames next to Chiswick Bridge, based at Tideway Scullers School boathouse, Dan Mason Drive, Chiswick, London.

History
The club incorporates Guy's Hospital and St Thomas' Hospital which itself merged to become GKT and then the United Medical and Dental School (UMDS) before merging with King's. In addition to competing in the Henley Royal Regatta and Head of the River Race, the club also takes part in the United Hospitals competitions which involves all London medical schools. The fleet of boats is stored at the boathouse belonging to the Tideway Scullers School.

The club won the prestigious Wyfold Challenge Cup at the Henley Regatta in 1946.

Honours

Henley Royal Regatta

See also
Rowing on the River Thames
University rowing in the United Kingdom

References

Tideway Rowing clubs
Sport in the London Borough of Hounslow
Chiswick
Buildings and structures in Chiswick
Rowing clubs of the River Thames
Rowing clubs in England
Student sport in London